Nasiksthan Sanga is a part of Banepa Municipality in Kabhrepalanchok District in the Bagmati Zone of central Nepal. At the time of the 2011 Nepal census it had a population of 6,121 in 1,305 individual households.

Place of attraction
Nasikasthan temple
Bikateswor temple
Ashapureswor temple
Kailashnath temple
Lateramshower temple

References

Asis Karki

External links
UN map of the municipalities of Kavrepalanchowk District

Populated places in Kavrepalanchok District